Galen Waling (born 1986) is an American–Canadian dual citizen rock and metal drummer. He is the drummer for Left Spine Down and Stiff Valentine, and he has worked with SMP, 16volt and Unit:187.

Biography 
Waling grew up in Kirkland, Washington, where he began learning to play the drums at the age of three thanks to a family friend. In 2005, Waling began touring with the band Desillusion.

Studio and touring work 
Waling became known for his precision, style and ability to adapt to many different styles of music. Ilker Yücel of ReGen magazine wrote that "Waling has become one of the industrial and machine rock scene’s most reliable and sought-after drummers."

References

External links
 GalenWaling.com
 

Living people
American rock drummers
American industrial musicians
Progressive rock musicians
American punk rock musicians
Canadian rock drummers
Canadian industrial musicians
Canadian punk rock musicians
Left Spine Down members
1986 births
21st-century American drummers
Julien-K members